Hans Leygraf (7 September 1920 – 12 February 2011) was a Swedish pianist, music educator, conductor and composer.

Life 
He was one of Sweden's most internationally renowned musicians and also a famous educator. He taught at  Edsbergs musical institute outside Stockholm, in Darmstadt, Hanover, Berlin and Salzburg. In Salzburg he was professor of piano at the Mozarteum between 1972 and 1990,  but continued until 2007 to give lessons for particularly talented students. He gave concerts back in 2010 (80 years after his debut) and was probably best known for his interpretations of Mozart and Schubert.

As a composer, Leygraf was a member of The Monday Group, but he stopped composing as early as the 1940s.

Leygrat died in Stockholm at the age of 90.

Recordings 
 Stenhammar Piano Concerto No. 2, Gothenburg Radio Orchestra / Sixten Eckerberg. Radiotjänst 1946 
 Blomdahl: Chamber Concerto. London Symphony Orchestra, Sixten Ehrling. DECCA 1965
 Mozart: Piano Concerto K.414, Fantasia K.475, Sonata K.457. The Swedish Radio Symphony Orchestra, Stig Westerberg. EMI 1976 
 Beethoven: Piano Concerto No. 2, Nationalmusei Chamber Orchestra, Claude Genetay. Polar 1980 
 Mozart: Piano Sonatas. SR Records vol. 1 1982, vol. 2 1984 
 Three Schubert Recitals. Caprice Records 1994
 Wolfgang Amadeus Mozart: The Complete Piano Sonatas. dB Productions 2002 
 Claude Debussy: The Preludes. dB Productions 2006 
 Joseph Haydn: Piano Sonatas, The 1960 and 2007 recordings, 2CD. dB Productions 2008
 Mozart: The Complete Piano Sonata Box. dB Productions Jan. 2006
 Beethoven: Opus 111 A Tribute to Pianist Hans Leygraf (1920–2011). dB Productions Sep. 2011 (Beethoven op. 110, recorded 1973 & Beethoven op. 111, recorded 1980)

Videography 
Hans Leygraf: Fundamental piano lessons, 2006.

Further reading 
Johan Pettersson: Tillsammans med Hans Leygraf: En studie av pianopedagogik och traditionsöverföring. Licentiatuppsats vid Piteå School of Music 2005

References

External links 
 
 
 

Swedish classical pianists
Swedish classical composers
Swedish conductors (music)
Male conductors (music)
1920 births
2011 deaths
Academic staff of the Hochschule für Musik, Theater und Medien Hannover
Members of the Royal Swedish Academy of Music
Litteris et Artibus recipients
Academic staff of Mozarteum University Salzburg
Musicians from Stockholm